Notre Dame de Lorette, also known as Ablain St.-Nazaire French Military Cemetery, is the world's largest French military cemetery.  It is the name of a ridge, basilica, and French national cemetery northwest of Arras at the village of Ablain-Saint-Nazaire. The high point of the hump-backed ridge stands 165 metres high and – with Vimy Ridge – utterly dominates the otherwise flat Douai plain and the town of Arras.

Site of four battles

The ground was strategically important during the First World War and was bitterly contested in a series of long and bloody engagements between the opposing French and German armies. It was the focal point of three battles:
 Battle of Arras (1914) (1–4 October 1914) – an encounter battle during the Race to the Sea
 First Battle of Artois (17 December 1914 –13 January 1915) – part of a combined attack with the First Battle of Champagne (20 December 1914 – 17 March 1915)
 Second Battle of Artois (9–15 May 1915) – French attack towards Vimy Ridge
 Third Battle of Artois (25 September–15 October 1915) – also known as the Artois–Loos Offensive

The Battles of Artois were as costly in French lives as the better-known Battle of Verdun. As with numerous other sites across France, Notre Dame de Lorette became a national necropolis, sacred ground containing the graves of French and Colonial fallen as well as an ossuary, containing the bones of those whose names were not marked.

Cemetery and ossuary

In total, the cemetery and ossuary hold the remains of more than 40,000 soldiers, as well as the ashes of many concentration camp victims.

The basilica and memorial buildings were designed by the architect Louis-Marie Cordonnier and his son Jacques Cordonnier, and built between 1921 and 1927.

Basilica
A small building was raised in 1727 by the painter Nicolas Florent Guilbert, who had made a successful pilgrimage to Loreto (Italy), to shelter a statue of the Virgin Mary. It was destroyed in 1794, rebuilt in 1816 and transformed in 1880.

Gallery

References

External links 

 Notre-Dame de Lorette
 ND de Lorette at Web Matters
 French site Notre Dame de Lorette 

Western Front (World War I)
Monuments and memorials in the Pas-de-Calais
Cemeteries in Pas-de-Calais
World War I in the Pas-de-Calais
Ossuaries
World War I cemeteries in France
Conflicts in 1914
Conflicts in 1915
Churches in Pas-de-Calais
Tourist attractions in Hauts-de-France
Tourist attractions in Pas-de-Calais
National cemeteries